A white hat (or a white-hat hacker, a whitehat) is an ethical security hacker. Ethical hacking is a term meant to imply a broader category than just penetration testing. Under the owner's consent, white-hat hackers aim to identify any vulnerabilities the current system has. The white hat is contrasted with the black hat, a malicious hacker; this definitional dichotomy comes from Western films, where heroic and antagonistic cowboys might traditionally wear a white and a black hat, respectively. There is a third kind of hacker known as a grey hat who hacks with good intentions but at times without permission.

White-hat hackers may also work in teams called "sneakers and/or hacker clubs", red teams, or tiger teams.

History
One of the first instances of an ethical hack being used was a "security evaluation" conducted by the United States Air Force, in which the Multics operating systems were tested for "potential use as a two-level (secret/top secret) system." The evaluation determined that while Multics was "significantly better than other conventional systems," it also had "... vulnerabilities in hardware security, software security and procedural security" that could be uncovered with "a relatively low level of effort." The authors performed their tests under a guideline of realism, so their results would accurately represent the kinds of access an intruder could potentially achieve. They performed tests involving simple information-gathering exercises, as well as outright attacks upon the system that might damage its integrity; both results were of interest to the target audience. There are several other now unclassified reports describing ethical hacking activities within the US military.

By 1981 The New York Times described white-hat activities as part of a "mischievous but perversely positive 'hacker' tradition". When a National CSS employee revealed the existence of his password cracker, which he had used on customer accounts, the company chastised him not for writing the software but for not disclosing it sooner. The letter of reprimand stated "The Company realizes the benefit to NCSS and encourages the efforts of employees to identify security weaknesses to the VP, the directory, and other sensitive software in files".

The idea to bring this tactic of ethical hacking to assess the security of systems was formulated by Dan Farmer and Wietse Venema. To raise the overall level of security on the Internet and intranets, they proceeded to describe how they were able to gather enough information about their targets to have been able to compromise security if they had chosen to do so. They provided several specific examples of how this information could be gathered and exploited to gain control of the target, and how such an attack could be prevented. They gathered up all the tools they had used during their work, packaged them in a single, easy-to-use application, and gave it away to anyone who chose to download it. Their program called Security Administrator Tool for Analyzing Networks, or SATAN, was met with a great amount of media attention around the world in 1992.

Tactics
While penetration testing concentrates on attacking software and computer systems from the start – scanning ports, examining known defects in protocols and applications running on the system, and patch installations, for example – ethical hacking may include other things. A full-blown ethical hack might include emailing staff to ask for password details, rummaging through executive dustbins and usually breaking, without the knowledge and consent of the targets. Only the owners, CEOs, and Board Members (stakeholders) who asked for such a security review of this magnitude are aware. To try and replicate some of the destructive techniques a real attack might employ, ethical hackers may arrange for cloned test systems, or organize a hack late at night while systems are less critical. In most recent cases these hacks perpetuate for the long-term con (days, if not weeks, of long-term human infiltration into an organization). Some examples include leaving USB/flash key drives with hidden auto-start software in a public area as if someone lost the small drive and an unsuspecting employee found it and took it.

Some other methods of carrying out these include:

 Disk and memory forensics
 DoS attacks
 Frameworks such as:
 Metasploit
 Network Security
 Reverse engineering
 Security scanners such as:
 Burp Suite
 Nessus
 W3af
 Social engineering tactics
 Training Platforms
 Vulnerability research

These methods identify exploit known security vulnerabilities and attempt to evade security to gain entry into secured areas. They can do this by hiding software and system 'back-doors' that can be used as a link to information or access that a non-ethical hacker, also known as 'black hat' or 'grey hat', may want to reach.

Legality in the UK
Struan Robertson, legal director at Pinsent Masons LLP, and editor of OUT-LAW.com says "Broadly speaking, if the access to a system is authorized, the hacking is ethical and legal. If it isn't, there's an offense under the Computer Misuse Act. The unauthorized access offense covers everything from guessing the password to accessing someone's webmail account, to cracking the security of a bank. The maximum penalty for unauthorized access to a computer is two years in prison and a fine. There are higher penalties – up to 10 years in prison – when the hacker also modifies data". Unauthorized access even to expose vulnerabilities for the benefit of many is not legal, says Robertson. "There's no defense in our hacking laws that your behavior is for the greater good. Even if it's what you believe."

Employment

The United States National Security Agency offers certifications such as the CNSS 4011. Such a certification covers orderly, ethical hacking techniques and team management. Aggressor teams are called "red" teams. Defender teams are called "blue" teams. When the agency recruited at DEF CON in 2020, it promised applicants that "If you have a few, shall we say, indiscretions in your past, don't be alarmed. You shouldn't automatically assume you won't be hired".

A good "white hat" is a competitive skillful employee for an enterprise since they can be a countermeasure to find the bugs to protect the enterprise network environment. Therefore, a good "white hat" could bring unexpected benefits in reducing the risk across systems, applications, and endpoints for an enterprise.

Notable people
 

Tamer Şahin (born 1981), Turkish white hat hacker

See also
 Bug bounty program
 IT risk
 MalwareMustDie
 Wireless identity theft

References

 
 Hacking (computer security)
Computer ethics